Yang Jianping (born 10 December 1979) is a Chinese recurve archer.

Yang competed at the 1996 Summer Olympics where she came 6th in the women's team event and 29th in the individual. She also competed at the 2000 Summer Olympics where she came 6th in the women's team event and 12th in the individual event.

She won a bronze medal at the 2002 Asian Games in the women's team event, a gold medal at the 2001 World Archery Championships in the women's team event and a gold medal at the 2000 World University Archery Championships in the women's individual event.

References

1979 births
Living people
Chinese female archers
Archers at the 1996 Summer Olympics
Archers at the 2000 Summer Olympics
Olympic archers of China
Sportspeople from Taiyuan
Asian Games medalists in archery
Archers at the 2002 Asian Games
Archers at the 2010 Asian Games
World Archery Championships medalists
Asian Games bronze medalists for China
Medalists at the 2002 Asian Games
21st-century Chinese women